Uckerby is a hamlet and civil parish in the Richmondshire district of  North Yorkshire, England. It situated at a crossroads on the road between Scorton and Moulton.

History
Uckerby first appears on record as Ukerby, in 1198. The place name is derived from two Old Norse elements: the first is thought to be an unattested Old Norse personal name, either *Úkyrri or *Útkári; the second element is býr, meaning farmstead.

The hamlet was once part of the parish of Catterick, but was included in the Bolton-on-Swale parish in the late nineteenth century. In the 13th century the land was held as part of the FitzAlan fee of the manor of Catterick, with the tenants having the same name as the hamlet. The manor had passed to Andrew de Harcla, Earl of Carlisle by the start of the next century, but had to be forfeited when he was defeated in the rebellion against Edward II. The manor then became the possession of the Scrope family of Bolton and followed the descent of the manor of Ellerton-on-Swale until its sale around 1734 to Henry Foster. It was briefly held by James Riddell and his son from 1777 to around 1872 before being bought once again by the lord of the manor of Ellerton-on-Swale.

Governance
The hamlet lies within the Richmond UK Parliament constituency. It also lies within the Catterick Bridge electoral division of North Yorkshire County Council and the Brompton-on-Swale and Scorton ward of Richmondshire District Council.

Geography
The parish is sandwiched between those of Moulton and Scorton. Ings Beck and Moulton Beck form a confluence to the east of the hamlet called Uckerby Beck, which eventually flow to the River Swale.

Both of the minor roads that cross the main road are dead ends.  The one that leads off to the west ends up in a farm yard, it is possible to follow a very rarely used footpath from here to Gatherley Road in Brompton-on-Swale. The other road which leads off to the east gradually turns into a farmers track and then into a public footpath which leads to another hamlet, Moulton End near North Cowton.

Demography

References

External links

Villages in North Yorkshire
Civil parishes in North Yorkshire